James Harry McGregor (September 30, 1896 – October 7, 1958) was an American World War I veteran who served nine terms as a Republican member of the U.S. House of Representatives from Ohio from 1940 to 1958.

Biography 

James Harry McGregor was born on a farm near Unionport, Jefferson County, Ohio.  He attended the public schools, West Lafayette College, and Oberlin College.

World War I 
During the First World War, he served as a sergeant with the One Hundred and Seventy-sixth Field Artillery, United States Army, in 1917 and 1918.

Political career 
He was engaged in the lumber and general contracting business at West Lafayette, Ohio, 1918-1945. He was a member of the school board of West Lafayette, Ohio, for eight years. He was a member of the Ohio House of Representatives from 1935 to 1940, serving as minority whip from 1937 to 1939 and as majority leader and speaker pro tempore in 1939 and 1940.

McGregor was elected as a Republican to the Seventy-sixth Congress to fill the vacancy caused by the death of William A. Ashbrook. He was reelected to the Seventy-seventh and to the eight succeeding Congresses and served until his death. He served as chairman of the Special Committee on Chamber Improvements during the Eightieth and Eighty-third Congresses. He had been renominated to the Eighty-sixth Congress.

Death 
He died  in Coshocton, Ohio, in 1958 at the age of 62. Interment in Fairfield Cemetery in West Lafayette, Ohio. McGregor voted in favor of the Civil Rights Act of 1957.

See also
 List of United States Congress members who died in office (1950–99)

Footnotes

Sources

The Political Graveyard

1896 births
1958 deaths
Republican Party members of the Ohio House of Representatives
People from Jefferson County, Ohio
United States Army personnel of World War I
20th-century American politicians
People from Coshocton County, Ohio
Republican Party members of the United States House of Representatives from Ohio